Edward Ozorowski (born 1 May 1941) is a Polish Roman Catholic clergyman. He served as the Auxiliary bishop in Białystok from 1979 to 2006. Ozorowski then served as the Metropolitan bishop in Białystok from 2006 to 2017. He was awarded Honorary citizenship of Wasilków in 2007. He was also honored by Białystok in 2014 and received the Minister of National Education award.

References 

1941 births
Living people
Bishops of Białystok
20th-century Roman Catholic archbishops in Poland
21st-century Roman Catholic archbishops in Poland